Tristan Pigott is a figurative artist based in London. His art featured in numerous magazines, shows and galleries. He graduated from Camberwell College of Arts in 2012.

Haaretz featured a painting of Pigott based upon social media trends and narcissism.

In 2015 he was shortlisted for the BP Portrait Award with the National Portrait Gallery, London. The same year he made a portrait of actress Sophie Kennedy Clark.

References

External links
 Pigott's website
 Dazed Digital, 2016
Tristan Pigott makes oil paintings for the instagram generation, VICE, i-d, November 2015

Year of birth missing (living people)
Place of birth missing (living people)
Living people
English contemporary artists
English mixed media artists
21st-century English painters
English male painters
21st-century English male artists